Pratap Shivram Singh (27 December 1912 – 24 January 1975) was an Indian politician, social worker and British Indian Army soldier as Junior commissioned officer. He was elected as Member of Parliament of Third, Fourth loksabha and 5th Lok Sabha from Shimla constituency. Shimla Lok Sabha was formerly known as Sirmur lok sabha and reserved for Scheduled castes. He was also president of Koli Mahasabha.

Singh died in Port Blair on 24 January 1975, at the age of 62.

Early life 
Pratap Shivram Singh was born to a agriculturist Koli Shivram Singh on 27 December 1912 in Nahan town of Sirmur State during British rule in India. He joined British Indian Army in 1932 and retired as Junior commissioned officer in 1950 and was awarded by five Army medals.

Other minor posts

As president 
 1932–1952, Akhil Bhartiya Kshatriya Koli Mahasabha
 1964, Paonta Labour Union, District Sirmur

As secretary 
 1950, Ex-Soldiers Association, District Sirmur
 1952–1962, Ajeet Cooperative M.P. Society Ltd

As member 
 1957–1962, Territorial Council, Himachal Pradesh

International travels 
Pratap Shivram Singh traveled to Pakistan and Burma.

References 

1912 births
1975 deaths
Koli people